The 2021–22 Algerian Ligue Professionnelle 1 was the 60th season of the Algerian Ligue Professionnelle 1 since its establishment in 1962. A total of 18 teams contested the league. It began on 8 October 2021 and concluded on 17 June 2022.

Teams
18 teams contest the league. HB Chelghoum Laïd and RC Arbâa were promoted from the 2020–21 Ligue 2.

Stadiums
Note: Table lists in alphabetical order.

Personnel and kits

Managerial changes

Foreign players

League table

Results

Positions by round

Clubs season-progress

Season statistics

Top scorers

Updated to games played on 17 June 2022 Source: soccerway.com

Hat-tricks

5 – Player scored five goals.
4 – Player scored four goals.

Monthly awards

Media coverage

See also
2021–22 Algerian Ligue 2

References

2021 in African football
2022 in African football
Algerian Ligue Professionnelle 1 seasons
Algeria